These People is the second and last studio album by the American punk band The Dicks, released in 1985 on Alternative Tentacles. By the time the record was recorded, The Dicks had changed half of their lineup, and relocated from Texas to San Francisco.

Track listing
The Police (Force) — 2:27
Off-Duty Sailor — 2:24
Executive Dive — 2:56
Sidewalk Begging — 3:50
Lost and Divided — 2:06
Dead in a Motel Room — 3:06
Cities are Burning — 3:08
Doctor Daddy — 2:11
Decent and Clean — 3:29
Legacy of Man — 3:21
Little Rock n' Roller — 2:43
George Jackson — 3:29

Personnel
Gary Floyd - Lead Vocals
Lynn Perko - Drums
Sebastian Fuchs - Bass
Tim Carroll - Guitar
Debbie Gordon - Mood Coordinator

References

The Dicks albums
1985 albums
Alternative Tentacles albums